The Women's 4 x 6 kilometre relay biathlon competition of the Sochi 2014 Olympics was held at Laura Biathlon & Ski Complex on 21 February 2014.

Summary
Ukraine won their first ever gold Olympic medal in biathlon (and the second gold winter Olympic medal, the first one since 1994 (won by Oksana Baiul), ahead of Russia, the defending champion, and Norway. It also became the fourth nation — after France, Russia, and Germany — to ever win the Olympic gold medal in women's biathlon relay.

For the first time Germany failed to reach the podium in Olympic women's relay. Franziska Preuß, who was running the first leg, fell and broke a pole. After that, Germany was never in the medal contention. Marie-Laure Brunet, running the first leg for France, collapsed, so France did not finish.

On 27 November 2017, the IOC disqualified Olga Vilukhina and Yana Romanova for doping violations and stripped Russia of the silver medal. Fellow teammate Olga Zaitseva was sanctioned on 1 December 2017. On 24 September 2020, the Court of Arbitration for Sport removed the sanctions from biathletes Olga Vilukhina and Yana Romanova, but upheld them on their teammate Olga Zaitseva. Medals in this event were redistributed by the IOC on 19 May 2022. The Czech team was awarded the medals on 4 March 2023 during the Biathlon World Cup in Nové Město na Moravě.

Results
The race was started at 18:30.

References

Relay